Joan Lee may refer to: 

Joan Boocock Lee (1922–2017), British-American model and voice actress and wife of Stan Lee
Joan Lee (cricketer) (born 1952), English cricketer
Joan Lee Tu (born 1981), Canadian linguist